Gabriel Sempé (2 April 1901 – 24 February 1990) was a French athlete. He competed in the 110 m hurdles at the 1924 and 1928 Summer Olympics, but failed to reach the finals; in 1924 he also did not finish his decathlon programme.

References

1901 births
1990 deaths
Sportspeople from Tarbes
French male hurdlers
French decathletes
Athletes (track and field) at the 1924 Summer Olympics
Athletes (track and field) at the 1928 Summer Olympics
Olympic athletes of France
Olympic decathletes
20th-century French people